Kittles is a surname. Notable people with the surname include:

Kerry Kittles (born 1974), American basketball player and coach
Rick Kittles (born 1976), American biologist
Tory Kittles (born 1975), American actor

See also
Kittle (surname)